Bangladesh competed in their fourth Commonwealth Games in 2002 sending male athletes in athletics and swimming and a mixed team in shooting. It won a gold medal in shooting, its first medal since Auckland 1990, when it won a gold and a bronze in shooting.

Medals

Gold
Shooting:
 Asif Hossain Khan Men's Air Rifle

See also
 2002 Commonwealth Games results

References

2002
2002 in Bangladeshi sport
Nations at the 2002 Commonwealth Games